The 2015 Illinois Fighting Illini football team represented the University of Illinois at Urbana–Champaign in the 2015 NCAA Division I FBS football season. They were led by interim head coach Bill Cubit, and played their home games at Memorial Stadium. They were members of the West Division of the Big Ten Conference. They finished the season 5–7, 2–6 in Big Ten play to finish in a tie for fifth place in the West Division.

On November 28, interim head coach Bill Cubit was signed to a two-year contract and named head coach. However, on March 5, Cubit was fired by new athletic director Josh Whitman.

Previous season
The 2014 Illinois Fighting Illini football team finished the regular season 6–6, with a highlight win against Northwestern which brought the team bowl eligible and was invited to play in the 2014 Heart of Dallas Bowl against the Louisiana Tech Bulldogs of Conference USA. The Bulldogs defeated the Illini in Dallas, Texas 35–18 finishing their 2014 Season at 6–7.

Head coach
On August 28, 2015—one week before the start of the regular season—head coach Tim Beckman was fired after an internal investigation found that he had made efforts "to deter injury reporting and influence medical decisions that pressured players to avoid or postpone medical treatment and continue playing despite injuries." He was replaced by offensive coordinator Bill Cubit on an interim basis for the season.

A few hours before the final game of the season, Cubit had the "Interim" removed from his title and was named permanent head coach. It was an appointment that would last only one game, as Cubit was removed during the following off-season by new Illinois Athletic Director Josh Whitman, on the day Whitman officially assumed the role, in favor of former Chicago Bears and Tampa Bay Buccaneers head coach Lovie Smith.

Schedule
Illinois announced their 2015 football schedule on June 3, 2013. The 2015 schedule consist of 7 home and 5 away games in the regular season. The Fighting Illini will host Big Ten foes Nebraska, Northwestern, Ohio State, and Wisconsin and will travel to Iowa, Minnesota, Penn State, and Purdue.

The Fighting Illini hosted three of their four non conference games against Kent State, Middle Tennessee and Western Illinois. Illinois traveled to Chapel Hill, North Carolina and faced the North Carolina of the Atlantic Coast Conference on September 19.

Schedule Source:

Roster

References

Illinois
Illinois Fighting Illini football seasons
Illinois Fighting Illini football